Amalia Yubi (born 31 January 1932) is a Mexican athlete. She competed in the women's javelin throw at the 1952 Summer Olympics.

References

1932 births
Living people
Athletes (track and field) at the 1952 Summer Olympics
Mexican female javelin throwers
Mexican female hurdlers
Olympic athletes of Mexico
Competitors at the 1954 Central American and Caribbean Games
Central American and Caribbean Games gold medalists for Mexico
Sportspeople from Sonora
Central American and Caribbean Games medalists in athletics
20th-century Mexican women